Fabrice Poullain (born 27 August 1962 in Alençon) is a French former professional football (soccer) player.

External links
http://www.fff.fr/servfff/historique/historique.php?id=POULLAIN%20Fabrice

1962 births
Living people
French footballers
France international footballers
FC Nantes players
Paris Saint-Germain F.C. players
AS Monaco FC players
OGC Nice players
Sportspeople from Alençon
Association football midfielders
Footballers from Normandy